When Fire Rains Down from the Sky, Mankind Will Reap as It Has Sown is the first EP by British extreme metal group Anaal Nathrakh. It was released by Mordgrimm Records in Europe and on Earache Records in North America. The EP was written right after The Codex Necro, and features guest appearances by Aborym's Sethlans Teitan on guitar and Attila Csihar of Mayhem on vocals. It was re-released in 2006 with three additional bonus live tracks. "Genesis of the Antichrist" is a remake of their earlier song "Anaal Nathrakh".

Track listing

Personnel
 Irrumator – all instruments
 Sethlans Teitan – guitar
 V.I.T.R.I.O.L. – vocals
 Attila Csihar – vocals ("Atavism")

References 

Anaal Nathrakh albums
2003 EPs
Earache Records EPs